Suraiya Multanikar (born 1940) is a Pakistani singer mostly known for her folk songs. Her repertoire includes classical, semi-classical, ghazal, folk songs and film songs.

Early life and family
Multanikar was born in Multan, Punjab. Her earliest childhood memories are of wanting to excel as a singer. No one in her immediate family could either teach or advise her. So in her childhood, she taught herself by listening to film songs and copying their tunes and lyrics. Later, she became a formal disciple of Ghulam Nabi Khan of the Delhi gharana of classical music who was a sarangi player.

Multanikar has 7 children (from oldest to youngest): Muhammad Ali, a UK-based orthopaedic doctor; Ruqaiya Sajjad; Ramzan Ali, Shaista, Rabia, Aalia and Rahat Bano. Her youngest daughter, Rahat Multanikar is also a folk singer like her mother.

Career

Radio Pakistan
On the radio, at age 15, she sang compositions by veteran Pakistani composers, Niaz Hussain Shami and Abdul Haq Qureshi. In her career as a singer, she was inspired from the works of Roshan Ara Begum, Ustad Salamat Ali Khan of Sham Chaurasia gharana, Bade Fateh Ali Khan of Patiala gharana and Mehdi Hassan.

Film industry
Multanikar's career as a playback singer was short lived. She gained widespread recognition for her song,"Bare Be Murawwat Hain Yeh Husn Walay", "Kahin Dil Laganey Ki Koshish Na Karna" written by Masroor Anwar, music by Deebo Bhattacharya from the Pakistani film, Badnaam (1966).

Awards and recognition
 1959: Golden Award
 1960: Chatta Gaang Award
 1964: Nigar Award
 1975: Gulam Fareed Award
 1980: Gulam Fareed Award
 1982: Jashn-e-Fareed Award
 1981: Shair-e-Mashriq Award
 1982: Shair-e-Mashriq Award
 1986: Pride of Performance Award by the President of Pakistan
 2000: Shahbaz Award
 2002: Gulam Fareed Award
 2008: Sitara-i-Imtiaz Award by the President of Pakistan

References

External links
 

1940 births
People from Multan
Punjabi people
Pakistani folk singers
Pakistani playback singers
Pakistani ghazal singers
Punjabi-language singers
Nigar Award winners
Singers from Lahore
Pakistani radio personalities
Pakistani film actresses
Recipients of the Pride of Performance
Recipients of Sitara-i-Imtiaz
Living people
Women ghazal singers
20th-century Pakistani women singers
Punjabi women
21st-century Pakistani women singers
Pakistani classical singers
Radio personalities from Lahore